A Murder Is Announced is a work of detective fiction by Agatha Christie, first published in the UK by the Collins Crime Club in June 1950 and in the US by Dodd, Mead and Company in the same month. The UK edition sold for eight shillings and sixpence (8/6) and the US edition at $2.50.

The novel features her detective Jane Marple. The murder is announced in advance a local newspaper in a small village; Miss Marple is staying at a spa hotel there for treatment. She works with Inspector Craddock of the county police.

The novel was well-received at publication. Remarks included: "The plot is as ingenious as ever, the writing more careful, the dialogue both wise and witty;"; and "Not quite one of her top notchers, but very smooth entertainment"; the murderer was "run to earth in a brilliantly conducted parlour game".; and "This jubilee whodunit is as deft and ingenious a fabrication as Agatha Christie has contrived in many a year." A later review was more mixed: "Superb reworking of the standard Christie setting and procedures, marred only by an excess of homicide at the end."

The book was heavily promoted upon publication in 1950 as being Christie's fiftieth book, although this figure could only be arrived at by counting in both UK and US short story collections.
	
A "distantly related" storyline had previously been explored in Christie's Miss Marple short story "The Companion", where the characters also lived in Little Paddocks.

Plot summary
A notice appears in the local newspaper for Chipping Cleghorn: "A murder is announced and will take place on Friday, 29 October, at Little Paddocks, at 6.30 pm. Friends accept this, the only intimation." This surprises Letitia Blacklock, owner of Little Paddocks. She prepares for guests that evening. Some villagers appear at the house, showing definite interest. As the clock strikes 6.30, the lights go out, and a door swings open, revealing a man with a blinding torch who demands the guests "Stick 'em up!" The game ends when shots are fired into the room. When the lights turn on, Miss Blacklock is bleeding, and the masked man is dead on the ground. Miss Blacklock's companion, Dora "Bunny" Bunner, recognises the man as Rudi Scherz, a Swiss man who worked for a local hotel and had recently asked Letitia for money.

The crime scene plus interviews with all who witnessed it lead police to drop the case, but Inspector Craddock is not satisfied. He learns that Scherz had a criminal background of petty theft and forgery. Then Craddock meets Miss Jane Marple at lunch with his boss and Sir Henry Clithering, at the hotel where Scherz worked. Craddock brings Miss Marple in to help with the case after her suggestions prove correct. Scherz's girlfriend Myrna Harris tells Craddock that Scherz had been paid to appear as the holdup man — a fall guy, as Miss Marple had said. He had not said who paid him. The police feel the real target is Letitia Blacklock, and that Scherz was killed by his unknown employer to prevent him talking.

Inspector Craddock discovers oil on the hinges of a door into the parlour, thought to be unused. Bunny mentions a table had been placed against the door until recently, further supporting the theory that someone slipped out behind Scherz and shot at Letitia. 

The motive for an attack on Miss Blacklock is straightforward, as she will soon inherit great wealth. She worked for the financier Randall Goedler. Randall Goedler's estate passed to his wife Belle, who is near death. When Belle dies, Miss Blacklock will inherit. If she predeceases Belle, the estate goes to "Pip" and "Emma", twin children of Randall's estranged sister, Sonia. Sonia broke with her brother 20 years ago upon her marriage to Dmitri Stamfordis. 

Craddock travels to Scotland to meet Belle. He learns that neither Belle nor Letitia knows where Sonia, Dmitri, Emma, or Pip are now. No-one knows what the grown twins look like. Belle tells about Letitia's sister Charlotte with a goitre. Their father, a doctor, did not believe in goitre surgery. Charlotte became a recluse as her goitre worsened. Dr Blacklock died shortly before the Second World War, and Letitia gave up her job with Goedler to take her sister to Switzerland for surgery. The two sisters waited out the war in Switzerland. Charlotte died suddenly of consumption. Letitia returned to England alone.

Miss Marple takes tea with Bunny. Bunny suspects Patrick Simmons; he, his sister Julia, and the young widow named Phillipa Haymes are all staying at Little Paddocks as guests. Bunny mentions that a shepherd lamp and shepherdess lamp in the house have been swapped; their tête-à-tête is interrupted when Letitia arrives.

Letitia holds a birthday party for Bunny, inviting almost everyone who was at the house when Scherz was killed. Mitzi, the cook, makes her special cake, nicknamed "Delicious Death". After the party, Bunny has a headache. She takes some aspirin from a bottle in Letitia's room. The next morning, Bunny is found dead, poisoned.  

Craddock finds that the photos of Sonia Goedler have been removed from old albums. Craddock finds old letters by Letitia to Charlotte in the attic at Little Paddocks. Miss Marple compares one to a current letter.

When the vicar's cat shorts out a lamp at the vicarage, the final clue falls into place for Miss Marple.

Miss Blacklock receives a letter from the real Julia Simmons, and she confronts her house guest, who reveals herself to be Emma Stamfordis. She denies attempting to kill Miss Blacklock, and says she has not seen her twin Pip since they were toddlers; their parents separated, each taking a child.

Misses Hinchcliffe and Murgatroyd, present at the Scherz shooting, work out that Miss Murgatroyd stood behind the opened door and was not blinded by the torch. She could see who was in the room. They realise that the person who left the room when the lights went out came around behind Scherz, and shot him and Miss Blacklock. Just as Miss Murgatroyd realises who was the one person not in the room, the phone rings, summoning Miss Hinchcliffe away. As Hinchcliffe drives away, Murgatroyd runs out, shouting, "She wasn't THERE!". On the way back home, Miss Hinchcliffe offers Miss Marple a ride, and together they discover Murgatroyd's body, strangled. Hinchcliffe tells Miss Marple of their discussion.

Inspector Craddock gathers everyone at Little Paddocks, where Mitzi claims to have seen Miss Blacklock shoot Scherz. Craddock dismisses her claim and accuses Edmund Swettenham of being Pip. However, Phillipa Haymes admits that she is Pip. Craddock then accuses Edmund of wanting to marry a rich wife by murdering Miss Blacklock so Phillipa will be wealthy. As Edmund denies this, a scream is heard from the kitchen, where they find Miss Blacklock attempting to drown Mitzi in the sink. When Miss Blacklock hears Dora Bunner's voice telling her to stop, she releases Mitzi, breaks down, and is arrested by Sergeant Fletcher.

Miss Marple explains that Letitia died of pneumonia in Switzerland. Aware that Letitia was in line to inherit a fortune, Charlotte posed as her deceased sister and returned to England a year earlier, in a village where few people knew her. She avoided people who knew Letitia well, like Belle Goedler, and covered her throat with strings of pearls to hide the scars from her surgery. Rudi Scherz had innocently recognized her, having worked at the Swiss hospital where she had her surgery; Charlotte killed him to prevent him talking to anyone. She hired Scherz and had him put in the advertisement to gain witnesses. She oiled the door and frayed a lamp cord, which she later shorted by pouring water on it when everyone was distracted by the clock chiming, so the room would be suddenly dark. She had then come behind Scherz and shot him, cutting her own ear with nail scissors before returning. That night, she replaced the frayed lamp with a new one (shepherd vs. shepherdess, as Bunny said). Bunny knew both sisters from childhood. Charlotte had taken Bunny into her confidence about the inheritance but not about the murder of Scherz. Bunny sometimes called her "Lotty" (Charlotte) instead of "Letty" (Letitia); Charlotte feared that Bunny might thereby reveal the truth, so Charlotte had poisoned some aspirin tablets taken by Bunny. Amy Murgatroyd had realised that Miss Blacklock was the one person whose face was not illuminated by Rudi Scherz's torch; Charlotte had overheard Hinchcliffe and Murgatroyd's conversation, and killed Murgatroyd as soon as Hinchcliffe left. 

Miss Marple persuaded Mitzi and Edmund to play parts in tripping up Charlotte Blacklock; Phillipa's admission to being Pip was not expected; Inspector Craddock kept up the act to claim Edmund was after Phillipa's money. Mitzi had agreed to serve as the bait, and Miss Marple imitated Bunny's voice to cause Charlotte to break down and confess.

Ultimately, Mitzi takes up a new post near Southampton. Phillipa and Emma inherit the Goedler fortune. Edmund and Phillipa marry and return to live in Chipping Cleghorn.

Setting
This novel is set just after World War II. Characters in the novel are still dealing with food rationing and the laws supporting it. This complicates communication with the police, as people in the village use barter as well as the coupons to get the food items they need. Furthermore, the connections among people in a village, and the extent to which they know and accept people new to the village, form an important aspect of this novel.

Robert Barnard remarks that Christie's first novel, The Mysterious Affair at Styles, is "one of the few Christies anchored in time and space: we are in Essex, during the First World War." His commentary on all of Christie's novels and short stories seems to miss the strong ties to time and place in A Murder Is Announced.

Characters
 Miss Jane Marple, an elderly spinster and amateur detective.
 Inspector Dermot Craddock, lead detective on the case.
 Sir Henry Clithering, retired head of Scotland Yard, consults with Chief Constable. He recommends his old friend Miss Marple to aid the police. He is godfather to Craddock.
 Chief Constable George Rydesdale, chief of the county investigation, Craddock's superior.
 Letitia Blacklock, lady of the house called Little Paddocks, in her sixties.
 Charlotte Blacklock, much-loved sister of Letitia; Belle Goedler tells Inspector Craddock that Charlotte died in Switzerland.
 Dora Bunner, Letitia's fluttery childhood friend, usually known by her nickname, "Bunny".
 Patrick Simmons, Miss Blacklock's young cousin. He calls her "aunt" due to the difference in ages.
 Julia Simmons, sister of Patrick.
 Mitzi, Miss Blacklock's foreign housekeeper and cook, a young refugee from Europe.
 Phillipa Haymes, a young widow with a young son, Harry, at boarding school. She is a paying guest at Little Paddocks and works nearby as a gardener.
 Colonel Archie Easterbrook, blustery old colonel just returned from India.
 Laura Easterbrook, his considerably younger, glamorous wife.
 Pip and Emma Stamfordis, twin children of Sonia and Dimitri, alternate heirs of their uncle Randall. Pip was recognized by Miss Blacklock early on, as Pip looks like her mother; Miss Blacklock does not directly state this. Others learn this only at the end. Emma is known to Patrick Simmons.
 Mrs Swettenham, widow who dotes on her grown son, Edmund.
 Edmund Swettenham, cynical young writer who is in love with Phillipa.
 Miss Hinchcliffe, physically fit woman who farms on a small scale.
 Miss Amy Murgatroyd, Miss Hinchcliffe's sweet-dispositioned, giggly friend.
 Belle Goedler, dying widow of Letitia's former wealthy employer Randall Goedler
 Julian Harmon, the vicar of Chipping Cleghorn.
 Diana "Bunch" Harmon, the vicar's wife. She is the daughter of good friends of Miss Marple, whom she calls Aunt Jane.
 Tiglath Pileser, the vicarage cat
 Rudi Scherz, a young man of Swiss extraction, the receptionist at a local spa hotel, and small time thief.
 Myrna Harris, girlfriend of Scherz, waitress at local spa hotel.
 Captain Ronald Haymes, estranged husband of Phillipa, said to have died fighting in Italy.
 Detective Sergeant Fletcher, assisting Craddock.
 Constable Legg.

References to other works
Edmund Swettenham announces that he has written "a roaring farce in three acts" titled Elephants Do Forget. Agatha Christie later wrote a novel named Elephants Can Remember featuring Hercule Poirot. "Scherz" was the name of the Swiss publisher (Scherz Verlag) which published Five Little Pigs in 1944 in German.

A "distantly related" storyline had previously been explored in Christie's Miss Marple short story "The Companion", where the characters also lived in a house called Little Paddocks.

Literary significance and reception
Julian MacLaren-Ross in The Times Literary Supplement was lavish in his praise of the book, after five years of not reviewing any of Christie's detective novels: "A new novel by Mrs Agatha Christie always deserves to be placed at the head of any list of detective fiction and her fiftieth book, A Murder is Announced, establishes firmly her claim to the throne of detection. The plot is as ingenious as ever, the writing more careful, the dialogue both wise and witty; while suspense is engendered from the very start, and maintained skilfully until the final revelation: it will be a clever reader indeed who anticipates this, and though Miss Christie is as usual scrupulously fair in scattering her clues, close attention to the text is necessary if a correct solution of the mystery is to be arrived at before the astute Miss Marple unmasks the culprit." The review concluded, "Miss Christie has several surprises up her sleeve besides the main one, and (this much may be said without spoiling the reader's pleasure) she once again breaks new ground by creating a weak and kindly murderer who is yet responsible for the deaths of three people: that such a character should, in the last analysis, seem credible, is a tribute to the author's psychological acumen and originality of concept."

Maurice Richardson, in the 4 June 1950 issue of The Observer, said, "For her fiftieth book she has chosen a snug, residential village setting with her favourite detective, silver-haired, needle-sharp spinster, Miss Marple, making a delayed appearance. Not quite one of her top notchers, but very smooth entertainment. The Prime Minister (Clement Attlee), who is her fervent admirer, might fittingly celebrate this jubilee by making her a Dame." (It took until 1971 for Christie to be awarded the DBE).

Norman Shrapnel in The Guardians issue of 9 June 1950 noted that this was Christie's 50th book and said that the murderer was "run to earth in a brilliantly conducted parlour game".

An unnamed reviewer in the Toronto Daily Star of 30 September 1950 opined that "A Murder is Announced displays all the adroit and well-bred legerdemain one has come to expect from Agatha Christie... This jubilee whodunit is as deft and ingenious a fabrication as Agatha Christie has contrived in many a year."

Robert Barnard: "Superb reworking of the standard Christie setting and procedures, marred only by an excess of homicide at the end. The book is distantly related to "The Companion", in The Thirteen Problems."

In the "Binge!" article of Entertainment Weekly Issue #1343–44 (26 December 2014 – 3 January 2015), the writers picked A Murder Is Announced as an "EW favorite" on the list of the "Nine Great Christie Novels".

Publication history
 1950, Collins Crime Club (London), June 1950, hardcover, 256 pp
 1950, Dodd Mead and Company (New York), June 1950, hardcover, 248 pp
 1951, Pocket Books (New York), paperback, 229 pp
 1953, Fontana Books (imprint of HarperCollins), paperback, 191 pp
 1958, Pan Books, paperback, 204 pp (Great Pan 144)
 1965, Ulverscroft large-print edition, hardcover, 246 pp
 1967, Greenway edition of collected works (William Collins), hardcover, 288 pp
 1967, Greenway edition of collected works (Dodd Mead), hardcover, 288 pp
 2005, Marple Facsimile edition (facsimile of 1950 UK first edition), 7 November 2005, hardcover 

The novel was serialised in eleven parts in the Daily Express from Tuesday 28 February to Saturday 11 March 1950. Five instalments carried an illustration by long-term Express artist Andrew Robb. This version did not contain any chapter divisions and contained only about half of the text that appeared in the book publication, totally omitting chapters five, six, seven, fourteen and the epilogue. It had been planned for this serialisation to take place closer to the eventual book publication in June 1950 but it was pulled forward by Christie's literary agent Edmund Cork in an effort to boost interest at the ailing box office for the play Murder at the Vicarage.

In the US, the first serial publication was in the Chicago Tribune in forty-nine parts from Monday 17 April to Monday 12 June 1950.

The book was heavily promoted upon publication in 1950 as being Christie's fiftieth book, a jubilee publication, although this figure was only arrived at by counting in both UK and US short story collections.

Film, TV, radio and theatrical adaptations

US television adaptation
The NBC anthology series Goodyear Playhouse broadcast an adaptation by William Templeton on 30 December 1956, with Gracie Fields as Miss Marple, Roger Moore as Patrick Simmons and Jessica Tandy as Letitia Blacklock.

British theatrical adaptation
Leslie Darbon adapted the novel into a stage play in 1977. It was first presented at the Theatre Royal, Brighton, by Peter Saunders – who brought Christie's The Mousetrap to the stage – and then on 21 September 1977 at the Vaudeville Theatre, London, which at the time he owned. 

The play first toured Australia in 2013 with Judi Farr as Miss Marple, Robert Grubb as Inspector Craddock and Libby Munro as Phillipa Haymes, directed by Darren Yap.

BBC television adaptation
The novel was adapted by Alan Plater and filmed in 1984 with Joan Hickson as Miss Marple and Ursula Howells as Miss Blacklock, directed by David Giles for the BBC series Miss Marple. Only a few changes were made: Mitzi was renamed Hannah and is said to be Swiss (in the book, her nationality is unknown) and in the novel the vicarage cat was male and called Tiglath Pileser. In this televised version the cat was female and called Delilah.

BBC radio adaptation
The novel was adapted for radio by Michael Bakewell, with June Whitfield as Miss Marple and Sarah Lawson as Miss Blacklock, directed by Enyd Williams, in five half-hour episodes. It was first broadcast on BBC Radio 4 in August 1999.

ITV adaptation
In 2005, it was part of the first season of the ITV series Agatha Christie's Marple which featured Geraldine McEwan as Miss Marple, Zoë Wanamaker as Letitia Blacklock, Keeley Hawes as Phillipa Haymes, Elaine Paige as Dora Bunner, Cherie Lunghi as Sadie Swettenham, Catherine Tate as Mitzi and Alexander Armstrong as Inspector Craddock. While the basic plot is retained from the novel, most of the characters have been heavily altered.

French television adaptation
The novel was adapted as a 2015 episode of the French television series Les Petits Meurtres d'Agatha Christie.

Korean television adaptation
The novel was adapted as part of the 2018 Korean television series, Ms. Ma, Nemesis.

Japanese television adaptation
TV Asahi adapted the novel in 2019 starring Ikki Sawamura and Mao Daichi, with the title Drama Special: Agatha Christie's A Murder Is Announced. This drama changed the main role to a chief inspector from Tokyo Metropolitan Police Department.

References

External links
A Murder  Announced at the official Agatha Christie website
Teacher's notes, Penguin Readers, Pearson Education

1950 British novels
Miss Marple novels
Novels first published in serial form
Works originally published in the Daily Express
Collins Crime Club books
British novels adapted into films
British novels adapted into television shows